Adamu Tesfaw (born 1933), also called Qes Adamu Tesfaw is an Ethiopian artist. 

Tesfaw was born in 1933, and raised in Bichena in Gojjam province. He was educated as a priest in the Ethiopian Orthodox Church. In the late 1950s, Tesfaw moved to Addis Ababa to pursue painting as a career, ultimately leaving the priesthood. There he had the help of his godfather Yohannes Tessema, a successful commercial artist. He sold paintings through his godfather, and later through several souvenir shops in Addis Ababa.

Tesfaw produces large paintings on cloth of scenes of Ethiopian culture and history, and also religious art in the Ethiopian Orthodox tradition.

His work has been featured in a number of showings of Ethiopian art overseas, and the UCLA Fowler Museum of Cultural History organized a touring exhibition of his work in 2004, which continued touring until at least November 2007. In 2004 he also appeared on the popular Ethiopian Television program "Meto Haya".

Further reading
Painting Ethiopia: The Life And Work Of Qes Adamu Tesfaw, University of California Los Angeles, Fowler (June 2005)

Notes

References

External links
Adamu's Autobiography

1933 births
Living people
Ethiopian painters